The 2010–11 Morehead State Eagles men's basketball team represented Morehead State University during the 2010–11 NCAA Division I men's basketball season. The Eagles, led by 5th year head coach Donnie Tyndall, played their home games at Ellis Johnson Arena and are members of the Ohio Valley Conference. They finished the season 25–10, 13–5 in Ohio Valley play and were champions of the 2011 Ohio Valley Conference men's basketball tournament to earn an automatic bid in the 2011 NCAA Division I men's basketball tournament. As a 13 seed, they upset 4 seed Louisville before falling to 12 seed Richmond in the third round.

Roster

Schedule
 
|-
!colspan=9| Ohio Valley Conference Basketball tournament

|-
!colspan=9| NCAA tournament

References

Morehead State
Morehead State
Morehead State Eagles men's basketball seasons
Morehead State Eagles men's basketball, 2010-11
Morehead State Eagles men's basketball, 2010-11